Steve Holeman (born December 21, 1967) is the head women's soccer coach at Texas State University, an NCAA Division I program in the Sun Belt Conference. He was named Texas State head coach on February 9, 2022. Prior to his position at Texas State, Holeman served as head coach at three Southeastern Conference universities starting the program at two of those universities.  He started the soccer program at Auburn serving as an interim head coach for one season (1993).  He moved to Ole Miss starting the women's soccer program there and served as head coach for fifteen seasons (1994–2010).  He moved to another Southeastern Conference university, Georgia serving as the Lady Bulldogs head coach for five seasons (2011–2015).  He served as head coach at Lamar University from 2016-2021.

Player
Holeman was a member of the Wake Forest Demon Deacons men's soccer team playing midfielder from 1987 to 1990.  He was a letter winner all four seasons.

Coaching career
Prior to assuming the Lamar Lady Cardinals soccer team head coach position, Holeman served at three Southeastern Conference universities as head coach starting the women's soccer program at two of the universities.

Huntsville, Alabama
Holeman coached the Huntsville, Alabama under-17 select boys team in 1991 to a state championship.

Auburn
Holeman started the Auburn Tigers women's soccer team in 1993 serving as interim head coach.  His team had a 7–6–3 record in its first season.  In addition to his 1993 interim head coaching position, he also coached the Auburn men's club team from 1992–1994.

Ole Miss
Holeman was hired as head coach for the Ole Miss Rebels women's soccer team in 1994 starting that program.  He served as head coach from 1994–2009 building a record of 159–119–28 overall and 62–62–19 in Southeastern Conference play.  His Ole Miss Rebels teams had four NCAA Tournament appearances (2002, 2003, 2005, and 2009).

Georgia
On April 16, 2010, Ole Miss announced that Holeman had accepted the head coaching position for the Georgia Lady Bulldogs soccer team.  He was head coach for the Georgia Lady Bulldogs soccer team from 2010–2014.  He accumulated a record of 53–39–11 overall and 24–24–1 in conference play while at Georgia.  His Georgia Lady Bulldog teams had two NCAA tournament appearances (2011 and 2014).  Holeman was terminated as Georgia Lady Bulldogs head coach on November 17, 2014 after his team lost in the first round of the 2017 NCAA Division I Women's Soccer Tournament.

Lamar
Holeman was named head coach on January 12, 2016.  He led the Lamar Lady Cardinals to their first Southland Conference regular season championship, first Southland Conference tournament championship, and first NCAA Division I Women's Soccer Tournament appearance in 2017, his second season with the program.  Holeman was named Southland Conference women's soccer coach of the year in 2017. He "... turned his team around from last place to first place in one season – a feat that had never been accomplished in Southland soccer history and only four times in any league sport."  While at Lamar, his teams won 2 Southland Conference regular season championships in 2017 and 2019, 2 Southland Conference tournament championships in 2017 and 2019, 1 conference second place finish in 2020, and appeared in the NCAA Division I Women's Soccer Tournament 2 times, 2017 and 2019.  In the Western Athletic Conference, his team was division runner-up in the Southwest Division 2021 regular season.

NCAA Division I head coaching record

(Won/loss records reflect results of games through November 10, 2017.)

References

External links
 Lamar Lady Cardinals coaching profile
 Wake Forest profile

1967 births
Living people
Lamar Lady Cardinals soccer coaches
Wake Forest Demon Deacons men's soccer players
Auburn Tigers women's soccer coaches
Ole Miss Rebels women's soccer coaches
Georgia Bulldogs women's soccer coaches
People from West Long Branch, New Jersey
Sportspeople from Monmouth County, New Jersey
Soccer players from New Jersey
Association football midfielders
American soccer coaches
Association football players not categorized by nationality